William D. "Hank" Taylor is a United States Army major general who serves as Director of Army Aviation of the United States Army since June 2022. He most recently served as the Deputy Director for Regional Operations and Force Management of the Joint Staff from June 2020 to June 2022, and previously served as the Senior Advisor to the Ministry of Defense of Afghanistan.

Taylor enlisted in the United States Army in 1988 and was commissioned in 1990. He completed a bachelor's degree at Brigham Young University in 1991 and reported for flight training. Taylor later earned a Master of Science degree in exercise physiology from Brigham Young University.

In February 2023, Taylor was assigned as commanding general of the 2nd Infantry Division.

References

American Master Army Aviators
Brigham Young University alumni
Living people
Place of birth missing (living people)
Recipients of the Air Medal
Recipients of the Legion of Merit
United States Army generals
United States Army personnel of the Iraq War
United States Army personnel of the War in Afghanistan (2001–2021)
Year of birth missing (living people)